Ronald Zabala-Goetschel (born 26 September 1966 in Quito) is an Ecuadorian equestrian. At the 2012 Summer Olympics he competed in the Individual eventing.

He also competed at the 2015 Pan American Games.

References

Ecuadorian male equestrians
1966 births
Living people
Olympic equestrians of Ecuador
Equestrians at the 2012 Summer Olympics
Equestrians at the 2007 Pan American Games
Equestrians at the 2011 Pan American Games
Equestrians at the 2015 Pan American Games
Pan American Games competitors for Ecuador
21st-century Ecuadorian people